This list of birthday songs contains songs which are the equivalent of Happy Birthday To You, sung around the globe on birthday occasions.

Based on the tune: Good Morning To All 
These are translations or variations sung to the tune that is commonly associated with the English language lyrics "Happy Birthday To You".
 : "Shumë urime për ty"
  Arabic countries: "سنة حلوة يا جميل" (Sana helwa ya gameel)
  and : "Que los cumplas feliz"
 "El payaso Plin-Plin" (children song with the same melody)
 : "Tsnundd shnorhavor" "Ծնունդդ շնորհավոր"
 : "Parabéns pra Você"
 : "Честит рожден ден" (Chestit rozhden den)
 :
 "Happy Birthday" (English-speaking Canada)
 "Bonne fête à toi" (French-speaking Canada)
 : "Cumpleaños feliz"
 : "Zhu ni shengri kuaile" (祝 你 生日 快乐)
 : "Cumpleaños feliz"
 : "Sretan rođendan ti"
 : (Unable to find name of real name of song, but here are the lyrics)                                                                                                                            "Cumpleaños feliz, Deseamos a tí, Cumpleños (nombre de la persona + tito/tita), cumpleaños feliz"!
 : "Palju õnne sulle!" or "Õnne soovime sul!"
 : "Paljon onnea vaan"
 : "Joyeux anniversaire"
 : "გილოცავ დაბადების დღეს" (gilotsav dabadebis dges)
 : "Zum Geburtstag viel Glück" and even the English original
 :
 Happy Birthday To You commonly sung in English
 "Sang Yat Go" (生日歌): Happy Birthday To You in Cantonese lyrics
 : "Boldog szülinapot"
 : "Hann(m)/Hún(f) á afmæli í dag"
 : "Lá breithe sona duit" 
 : Happy Birthday to You often sung in English. वाढदिवसाच्या हार्दिक शुभेच्छा (Vad Divasachya Hardik Shubhchchya) in Marathi or जन्मदिन की शुभकामनाये (Janmdin Ki Shubh Kamanayen) in Hindi or ജന്മദിനാശംസകള്‍ നേരുന്നു (Janma dinasamsakal Nerunnu) in Malayalam and in Tamil (பிறந்தநாள் நல்வாழ்த்துக்கள்) and in Telugu జన్మదిన శుభాకాంక్షలు / పుట్టినరోజు శుభాకాంక్షలు (Janma Dina Shubhakankshalu / Puttina Roju Shubakankshalu) and in Kannada (Huttu Habbada Shubhashayagalu) and in Konkani (Vad Divasache Mast Mast Shubhashayu)
  : "Selamat Ulang Tahun" often sung in English tune. Or
 "Selamat Ulang Tahun, kami ucapkan. Selamat panjang umur, kita 'kan doakan. Selamat sejahtera, sehat sentosa. Selamat panjang umur, dan bahagia" Sung in Dutch/Belgium/Malay/Others tune.
 :
 Happy Birthday ( Yom Huledet Same'ach)
 : "Tanti auguri a te"
 : 
Happy Birthday to You often sung in English, especially Elmo's version on Sesame Street.
'(O)tanjobi Omedeto' (お誕生日おめでとう) is sung in the same tune.
 : 생일 축하 합니다 (saeng-il chukha hamnida)
 : "Su gimimo diena"
 :
 "Selamat Hari Jadi" - also commonly sung in English
 : "Een fijne verjaardag voor jou". Dutch Children often sing the song in different languages (like English German, French parody Russian and parody Chinese)
 "Welgefeliciteerd" (most often used)
 "Happy Birthday to you" often sung in English
 "Happy birthday to you, I went to the zoo, I saw a fat monkey and I knew/thought it was you" (parody)
 "Happy Birthday to you, in de wei staat een koe en die koe zei: 'I love you' Happy birthday to you" (sweet parody)
 "Hankie pankie Shanghai" (parody on Chinese sung by children)
 "wushni wushni wush wush" (parody on Russian sung by children)
 "Happy birthday to you, Squished bananas in stew, And bananas in pyjamas, Happy birthday to you" (banana parody)
 : "Hari huritau ki a koe" (Māori)
 : It Is Your Birthday by LekanA 
  : "Cumpleaños Feliz"
 'Happy Birthday to You' sung right before it (in English)
 : "Maligáyang Bátì"
 Happy Birthday to You also sung in English
 : Parabéns A Você
 : С днём рожденья тебя (S dn'om rozhden'ya teb'a) (sometimes sung in English)
 : "Srećan ti rođendan!" (Cyrillic: "Срећан ти рођендан!")
 : "Veľa šťastia, zdravia"
 : "Vse najboljše za te"
 : "Cumpleaños Feliz" (also see below)
 Catalonia and Valencian Community: "Moltes felicitats"
 Basque: "Zorionak zuri"
 Galicia: "Felíz Aniversario"
 :
 Sinhala"සුභ උපන්දිනයක් වේවා"(Suba Upan Dinayak Wewa)
 : Hip Hooray Hip Hooray Dhalasho Wacan and Tanti auguri a te
 :
 Swiss German: "Zom Geburtstag vell Glück"
Happy Birthday to You often sung in English, French, and Italian
 Swiss French: "Joyeux anniversaire" like in France
 Swiss Italian: "Tanti auguri a te" like in Italy
  - "ㄓㄨˋ  ㄋㄧˇ  ㄕㄥ  ㄖˋ  ㄎㄨㄞˋ  ㄌㄜˋ" (祝 你 生日 快樂)
 :สุขสันต์วันเกิด
 : "İyi ki doğdun (isim)"
 : Happy birthday to you
 : Happy birthday to you
 : "Penblwydd hapus i chi"
 many local parody versions substituting a few words that fit the tune for comic effect,
  e.g. "Happy birthday to you, I went out to the zoo, I saw a great monkey, And he looked just like you,"  
       "Happy birthday to you, Squashed tomatoes in stew, And bananas in pajamas, Happy birthday to you," and
 "Happy birthday to you, You live in a zoo, You look like a monkey, And you smell like one too."
       Some of these parody versions are sung by those wishing to make a point about the copyright status of the proper lyrics.

Other traditional songs 
 :
 Lang zal hij/zij leven
 :
Parabéns da Xuxa
Parabéns do Carequinha
 : Много Лета (mnogo leta) : Many Years
  (French Canada): Gens du pays (Mon/Ma cher/chère [name], c'est à ton tour, de te laisser parler d'amour [bis])
 : "Štěstí, zdraví"
 : Felicidades
 : 
 [Navn] har fødselsdag ("[Name] has a birthday")
 In Greenland: Inuuissiortoq pilluarit ("Congratulations, Birthday Child")
 : El Regalo Mejor (Celebro tu cumpleaños)
  :  ("Happy Birthday, sincerest wishes to you")
 : მრავალჟამიერ (Mravalzhamier) : Many Years
 :
Viel Glück und viel Segen
 Hoch soll er/sie leben
Wie schön, dass du geboren bist (song by Rolf Zuckowski)
 : "Να ζήσεις και χρόνια πολλά" (Na zisis ke hronia polla)
 : 
 "Zuk Sau Go" (祝壽歌): 恭祝你　福壽與天齊　慶賀你生辰快樂　年年都有今日 歲歲都有今朝 恭喜你 恭喜你
  (Hindi): Janam Din ki hardik shubhkamana/badhai
 : 
 Selamat Ulang Tahun
 Panjang Umurnya (based from the Dutch Lang zal hij/zij leven)
 : "Tavalodet Mobarak" تولدت مبارک ("blessed be your birthday") by Anoushiravan Rohani
 :
 Today is a Birthday ( HaYom Yom Huledet)
 Birthday ( Yom Huledet)
 : Daudz baltu dieniņu
 : Ilgiausių metų
 : Allah selamatkan kamu /  ("May Allah bless you"), popularized through movies of P. Ramlee such as Nasib Labu Labi and Tiga Abdul.
 : Las Mañanitas
 : "Janma din ko Subhakamana"
 :
 Er is er een jarig
 Lang zal hij/zij leven
 Twee violen en een trommel en een fluit
 Oh wat zijn wij heden blij (A more informal children's song, sung in school before treats are distributed)
 Hij/zij leve hoog
 
 Gratulerer med dagen
 Hurra for deg
 
 Salgirah Mubarak Ho (Urdu)
 Kaliza Umbarak Sha (Pashto)
 : Sto lat ("[We wish you to live] A hundred years")
 : Mulţi ani trăiască
 : Песенка Крокодила Гены (Song of Crocodile Gena)
 : Danas nam je divan dan
 : Veels geluk liewe maatjie (Afrikaans language:  Much happiness dear friend - also slightly religious - Christian)
 : Feliz, feliz en tu día, originally from a TV show but now quite extended as a traditional birthday song.
 : A di mi yere yu friyari (Sranan Tongo)
 : Ja, må han (hon) leva 
 : Хари Бирдеи то иу (Happy birthday to you)
 : Happy birthday
 : Ay, que noche tan preciosa
 Yiddish: "צו דײַן געבורטסטאָג Tsu Dayn Geburtstog (Written by Avrom Goldfaden around 1877-1878 for his operetta di kishufmakherin)

Notes 

 
Birthday songs